Narwonah is a railway station, on the Parkes–Narromine railway line on the outskirts of Narromine in Central, New South Wales. The station is 547.05km from Sydney at 148.1915°E and -32.30°S.
It opened 12-Dec-1910 and on 23-Nov-1974 Closed to passengers.
The locality was featured on  the Australian ten-pound note.

References

Regional railway stations in New South Wales
Railway stations in Australia opened in 1910
Railway stations closed in 1974